Noel Road is a small community in the Canadian province of Nova Scotia, located in  The Municipality of the District of East Hants in Hants County.  The community is named after Noel Doiron.

References
Noel Road on Destination Nova Scotia

Communities in Hants County, Nova Scotia
General Service Areas in Nova Scotia